The 2018–19 Vijay Hazare Trophy was the 17th season of the Vijay Hazare Trophy, a List A cricket tournament in India. It was contested by the 37 domestic cricket teams of India, with ten teams in Group C. The group stage started on 19 September 2018, with the top two teams from Group C progressing to the quarter-finals of the competition.

In the Round 2 fixture between Rajasthan and Jharkhand, Jharkhand's Shahbaz Nadeem set a new List A cricket record, taking eight wickets for ten runs from ten overs.

Haryana and Jharkhand both progressed from Group C to the knock-out phase of the tournament.

Points table

Fixtures

Round 1

Round 2

Round 3

Round 4

Round 5

Round 6

Round 7

Round 8

Round 9

Round 10

Round 11

Round 12

Round 13

Round 14

Round 15

References

Vijay Hazare Trophy
Vijay Hazare Trophy
Vijay Hazare Trophy